Szofi Ozbas (born 19 October 2001) is a Hungarian judoka. She competed in the women's 63 kg event at the 2020 Summer Olympics held in Tokyo, Japan.

She is the 2019 Youth World Champion in the -63 kg class.

She won one of the bronze medals in her event at the 2022 Judo Grand Slam Tel Aviv held in Tel Aviv, Israel.

References

External links
 
 
 

2001 births
Living people
Hungarian female judoka
Judoka at the 2018 Summer Youth Olympics
Youth Olympic gold medalists for Hungary
Judoka at the 2019 European Games
European Games competitors for Hungary
Judoka at the 2020 Summer Olympics
Olympic judoka of Hungary
21st-century Hungarian women